St Monica's GAA is a Gaelic Athletic Association club in based in Edenmore, Raheny, in the northern suburbs of Dublin.

The club was formed in 1964 and was originally called Edenmore Gaels. The club name was changed, in 1968, to St Monica's after the local parish church.

The club has adult football, hurling, camogie and ladies football teams and underage teams at various levels.

Roll of Honour

Notable players

References

External links
Official Club Website

Gaelic games clubs in Dublin (city)
Gaelic football clubs in Dublin (city)
Hurling clubs in Dublin (city)
Camogie clubs in County Dublin